is a city located in Fukuoka Prefecture, Japan. The city was founded on November 3, 1943. As of October 1, 2018, the city has an estimated population of 48,241, with 24,537 households. Its total area is 54.52 km².

Tagawa was historically a coal mining city, and is easily recognizable by its two tall chimneys located near Tagawa-Ita (田川伊田駅). Currently active industries in Tagawa include limestone and cement production. Tirol (チロル) miniature chocolates are manufactured in Tagawa. The TRIAL Kyushu warehouse is located in Ita-machi, and services TRIAL discount stores in all prefectures in Kyushu.

Tagawa is serviced by two main JR stations, Tagawa-Ita (田川伊田) and Tagawa-Gotōji (田川後藤寺). These stations provide transport links to Kokura, Hita, and Shin-Iizuka via the Hitahikosan Line (日田彦山線) and Gotōji Line (後藤寺線). In addition, the private rail company Heisei Chikuho Railway Line (terminal points: Yukuhashi and Nōgata) makes major stops at both Tagawa-Ita and Tagawa-Gotōji. The Coto Coto Train touristic service stops here.

References

External links

 Tagawa City official website 
 Google Map of Tagawa

 
Cities in Fukuoka Prefecture